Canady is an extinct town in Pemiscot County, in the U.S. state of Missouri.  A variant name was "Canady Switch".

A post office called Canady was established in 1904, and remained in operation until 1927. The community was named after John Canady, the proprietor of a local sawmill.

References

Ghost towns in Missouri
Former populated places in Pemiscot County, Missouri